Vivacricotopus is a genus of flies belonging to the family Chironomidae.

The species of this genus are found in Southern Europe.

Species:
 Vivacricotopus ablusus Schnell & Saether, 1988 
 Vivacricotopus elgandzha Makarchenko & Makarchenko, 2005

References

Chironomidae